Hunt Library may refer to:
James B. Hunt Jr. Library at North Carolina State University
Hunt Memorial Library in Nashua, New Hampshire
William Morris Hunt Memorial Library, a library at the Museum of Fine Arts, Boston
 Hunt Library, a library at Carnegie Mellon University